Justin Portal Welby (born 6 January 1956) is a British bishop who has served as the 105th Archbishop of Canterbury since 2013. Welby was previously the vicar of Southam, Warwickshire, and later Bishop of Durham, serving for just over a year. Ex officio, he is the Primate of All England and the symbolic head primus inter pares of the worldwide Anglican Communion.

Welby was educated at the University of Cambridge where he read history and law. Later in life, he studied for ordination at St John's College, Durham. After several parochial appointments, he became Dean of Liverpool in 2007 and Bishop of Durham in 2011.

Welby's theology is reported as representing the "open evangelical" tradition within Anglicanism. Having worked in business before his ordination, some of his publications explore the relationship between finance and religion and, as a member of the House of Lords, he sat on the panel of the 2012 Parliamentary Commission on Banking Standards.

Early life and education

Justin Portal Welby was born in Middlesex, England, on 6 January 1956, almost nine months after the marriage of his mother, Jane Gillian Portal (born 1929), to Gavin Bramhall James Welby (1910–1977). Jane had served as a personal secretary to Sir Winston Churchill from December 1949 until her marriage to Gavin Welby in April 1955. Soon after she had a brief relationship with the private secretary to Churchill, Sir Anthony Montague Browne (1923–2013). Welby believed that Gavin Welby was his biological father until paternity testing in 2016 showed that he was Browne's son.

Gavin Welby, born Bernard Gavin Weiler in Ruislip, Middlesex was the son of Bernard Weiler, a German-Jewish immigrant and importer of luxury items who changed the family name to Welby shortly after the First World War broke out. Gavin Welby stood for Parliament in the 1951 and 1955 general elections as a Conservative candidate. Welby describes his early childhood as "messy": Gavin and Jane Welby were both alcoholics. They divorced in 1959, when Justin was three years old, and he was placed in Gavin Welby's custody. In 1960 Gavin Welby was engaged to the actress Vanessa Redgrave, who called the engagement off after her mother Lady Redgrave wrote to Vanessa's father, Sir Michael Redgrave, that Gavin Welby was "a real horror ... a pretty rotten piece of work". Gavin Welby died in 1977 of alcohol-related causes.

Welby's mother stopped drinking in 1968, and in 1975 married Charles Williams, a business executive and first-class cricketer who was made a life peer in 1985. Williams was the nephew of Elizabeth Laura Gurney, a member of the Gurney family of Norwich who were prominent Quakers and social reformers. Welby describes his stepfather as being supportive of him.

Maternal family
Welby's mother, Jane Portal, was the daughter of Iris Butler (1905–2002), a journalist and historian whose brother, Rab Butler, was a Conservative politician who served as Chancellor of the Exchequer, Home Secretary, Deputy Prime Minister, Foreign Secretary and Master of Trinity College, Cambridge. Their father was Sir Montagu Butler, Governor of the Central Provinces of British India and Master of Pembroke College, Cambridge. Montagu Butler was the grandson of George Butler, headmaster of Harrow School and Dean of Peterborough; the nephew of educator George Butler (husband of social reformer Josephine Butler) and Henry Montagu Butler, headmaster of Harrow School, Dean of Gloucester and Master of Trinity College, Cambridge; and the grand-nephew of John Colenso, the first Bishop of Natal.

Jane Portal's father was Gervas Portal, a half-brother of the World War II Chief of the Air Staff, Charles Portal, 1st Viscount Portal of Hungerford. Gervas Portal's mother Rose Leslie Portal née Napier was the granddaughter of General Sir William Napier and his wife, Caroline Amelia Fox. General Napier and his brothers, General Sir Charles James Napier and General Sir George Thomas Napier (respectively commanders-in-chief of the British armies in India and in the Cape Colony), were sons of George Napier (a sixth-generation descendant, via the Lords Napier, of John Napier, the inventor of logarithms) and his second wife Lady Sarah Lennox. Caroline Amelia Fox was the daughter of General Henry Edward Fox, younger brother of prominent Whig politician Charles James Fox; they were the sons of politician Henry Fox, 1st Baron Holland, and his wife Lady Caroline Lennox. Caroline Lennox and Sarah Lennox were two of the five Lennox sisters, daughters of the 2nd Duke of Richmond, son of Charles Lennox, 1st Duke of Richmond, illegitimate son of King Charles II and his mistress Louise de Kérouaille, Duchess of Portsmouth.

Education

Welby was educated at St Peter's School, Seaford between 1964 and 1968; Eton College; and Trinity College, Cambridge, where his great-uncle, Lord Butler of Saffron Walden, was then master. He graduated in 1978 with a Bachelor of Arts degree in history and law; according to custom, he was later promoted to Master of Arts by seniority.

In a 2013 interview with The Daily Telegraph, Welby related his conversion experience when he was a student at Trinity College, Cambridge. He said that, while he was at Eton, he had "vaguely assumed there was a God. But I didn't believe. I wasn't interested at all." However, during the evening of 12 October 1975 in Cambridge, praying with a Christian friend, Welby said that he suddenly felt "a clear sense of something changing, the presence of something that had not been there before in my life". He said to his friend, "Please don't tell anyone about this." Welby said that he was desperately embarrassed that this had happened to him. In a 2014 interview, Welby said that his conversion had come when his friend had taken him to an "evangelistic address" which he found to be poor. After this, his friend "simply explained the Gospels" to him. Welby said that from that point onwards he "knew the presence of God". He has since said that his time at Cambridge was a major moment of self-realisation in his life.  

He has said that the age of 19, he began speaking in tongues.

Business career
Welby worked for eleven years in the oil industry, five of them for the French oil company Elf Aquitaine based in Paris. In 1984 he became treasurer of the oil exploration group Enterprise Oil plc in London, where he was mainly concerned with West African and North Sea oil projects. He retired from his executive position in 1989 and said that he sensed a calling from God to be ordained.

During his oil industry career, Welby became a congregation member at the evangelical Anglican church of Holy Trinity in Brompton, London.

In July 2013, following the report of the Parliamentary Commission on Banking Standards, Welby explained that senior bank executives avoided being given information about difficult issues to allow them to "plead ignorance".  He also said he would possibly have behaved in the same way and warned against punishing by naming and shaming individual bankers which he compared to the behaviour of a lynch mob.

Ministry
Welby was at first rejected for ordination by John Hughes, the Bishop of Kensington, who told him: "There is no place for you in the Church of England."

Welby was subsequently accepted for ordination, with the support of the Vicar of Holy Trinity Brompton, Sandy Millar. Throughout his ministry Welby has been linked to the charismatic evangelical wing of the Church of England associated with Holy Trinity Brompton, and in a 2019 interview said: "In my own prayer life, and as part of my daily discipline, I pray in tongues every day."

From 1989 to 1992, Welby studied theology and trained for the priesthood at Cranmer Hall and St John's College, Durham, where he was awarded a Bachelor of Arts (BA) degree and a Diploma in Ministry (DipMin) in 1992. He was ordained a deacon at Petertide (on 28 June) 1992 and a priest the next Petertide (27 June 1993), both times by Simon Barrington-Ward, Bishop of Coventry, at Coventry Cathedral.  He then became a curate at Chilvers Coton and St Mary the Virgin, Astley (Nuneaton) from 1992 to 1995. He then became rector of St James' Church, Southam, and later vicar of St Michael and All Angels, Ufton, Diocese of Coventry, from 1995 to 2002.

In 2002, Welby was appointed a canon residentiary of Coventry Cathedral and the co-director for international ministry at the International Centre for Reconciliation. In 2005, he was appointed sub-dean and Canon for Reconciliation Ministry.

Welby was appointed Dean of Liverpool in December 2007 and was installed at Liverpool Cathedral on 8 December 2007.

Welby has written widely on ethics and on finance, featuring in books such as Managing the Church?: Order and Organisation in a Secular Age and Explorations in Financial Ethics. Welby's dissertation, an exploration into whether companies can sin, marks his point that the structure of a system can "make it easier to make the right choice or the wrong choice." His dissertation led to the publication of a booklet entitled Can Companies Sin?: "Whether", "How" and "Who" in Company Accountability, which was published by Grove Books in 1992. He has said that the Benedictine and Franciscan orders in the Anglican churches, along with Catholic social teaching, have influenced his spiritual formation.

Interviewed by the BBC in 2011, Welby said that to be appointed Bishop of Durham was both challenging and a huge privilege: "I was astonished to be offered the role. It is a passionate desire to see a church that is vigorously full of spiritual life, serving Jesus Christ and serving those around it."

Welby's election was confirmed at York Minster on 29 September 2011, and he left Liverpool Cathedral on 2 October. He was consecrated as a bishop at York Minster on 28 October 2011 by John Sentamu, Archbishop of York; and was enthroned in Durham Cathedral on 26 November 2011. He was introduced to the House of Lords on 12 January 2012, where he sits on the Lords Spiritual bench. He gave his maiden speech on 16 May 2012.

Welby was asked to join the Parliamentary Commission on Banking Standards in 2012.

Archbishop of Canterbury

Welby emerged as a candidate to be the next archbishop of Canterbury; his appointment to the position was announced on 9 November 2012. In January 2013, Welby said that he initially thought it was "a joke" and "perfectly absurd" for him to be appointed Archbishop of Canterbury, because he had only been a bishop for a short time. His confirmation of election ceremony to the See of Canterbury took place at St Paul's Cathedral on 4 February 2013 (by this, he legally became Archbishop of Canterbury); on the following day it was announced that Welby would be appointed to the Privy Council of the United Kingdom, as all archbishops are; the order for his appointment was made on 12 February and he swore the oath on 13 March.

Welby was enthroned as archbishop at Canterbury Cathedral on 21 March 2013, which in the calendar of the Anglican churches is an observance of Thomas Cranmer.

Welby's schedule included an official visit to the Vatican on 14 June 2013, with visits to senior Curial officials, including Cardinal Kurt Koch, President of the Pontifical Council for Promoting Christian Unity, an official audience with Pope Francis and prayer at the tombs of Saint Peter and Pope John Paul II.

In a 12 July 2013 interview with The Daily Telegraph, Welby addressed questions about his religion. His answers included the following:
Asked whether he can speak "in tongues", Welby answered, "Oh yes, it's just a routine part of spiritual discipline — you choose to speak and you speak a language that you don’t know. It just comes."
Asked whether it is necessary "for a true Christian to have had a personal conversion experience", Welby answered, "Absolutely not. There is an incredible range of ways in which the Spirit works. It doesn’t matter how you get there. It really does quite matter where you are."
Asked about "his strange and lonely youth", Welby said that "at the time, it felt horrible. Now it feels hugely valuable. God doesn’t waste stuff." The interviewer asked Welby whether his family history had "wounded" him. After "a very long" pause, Welby answered, "I assume that I am, but I also assume that the grace of God is extraordinarily powerful in the healing of one’s wounds."
Asked whether he knows Jesus, Welby answered, "Yes. I do. He's both someone one knows and someone one scarcely knows at all, an utterly intimate friend and yet with indescribable majesty."
Regarding his religious practices, Welby called himself "a spiritual magpie". The interviewer commented about Welby, "as well as speaking in tongues, he adores the sacrament of the Eucharist. He also says the morning and evening office, Book of Common Prayer version, in the chapel of the palace, every day. For Welby, 'the routine of regular prayer is immensely important in overcoming the ups and downs of human moods.' For his spiritual discipline, Welby uses Catholic models – the contemplation and stability of Benedictines and the rigorous self-examination of Ignatius of Loyola. He also has a spiritual director, the Roman Catholic priest Nicolas Buttet.
The interviewer said that the church "is good at talking, but not at actually doing things to improve the social order." Welby retorted, "Rubbish! It is one of the most powerful forces of social cohesion. Did you know that each month all the Churches – roughly half of the numbers being Anglican – contribute 23 million hours of voluntary work, outside what they do in church? And it's growing. There are now between 1,200 and 2,000 food banks in which the Church is involved. Ten years ago, there were none. There are vicars living in every impoverished area in the country. This springs out of genuine spirituality."
In January 2019, Welby responded to Anglican priests defecting to the Roman Catholic church by saying "Who cares?" and that he did not mind people leaving to join other denominations as long as they are 'faithful disciples of Christ.'

Welby is expected to preside over the Coronation of Charles III and Camilla on 6 May 2023. He will be the first Archbishop of Canterbury to preside over a coronation service in around seventy years. The last Archbishop to preside over a coronation was Geoffrey Fisher who presided over the Coronation of Elizabeth II on 2 June 1953.

In 2023, following the Church of England's decision to offer blessings to married couples of the same sex, Welby's leadership of the Anglican church was "rejected" by a group of ten archbishops worldwide, who said they were "no longer able to recognise the present Archbishop of Canterbury as the first among equals leader of the global communion."

Views

Brexit and austerity 
In February 2018, Welby expressed fears that Brexit was dividing UK society and the United Kingdom government austerity programme was harming vulnerable people. Welby wrote:

In August 2019, Welby called for EU Remainers to "stop whingeing" and accept the result of the 2016 Brexit referendum.

COVID-19
In January 2021, Welby received his first COVID-19 vaccine, writing on Twitter: "The rapid development of the vaccine is an answer to prayer – and it is central to the recovery from this terrible pandemic". He has spoken out against "malicious rumour-mongering" relating to the pandemic.

Welby also said he was concerned that the COVID-19 pandemic in the United Kingdom exacerbated existing inequalities. He spoke with bereaved families and added tributes to the National Covid Memorial Wall (representing those who died of COVID-19). In April 2021, Welby called for the start of a COVID-19 public inquiry.

Environmental sustainability 
In 2021, Welby, Pope Francis, and Bartholomew I, current Ecumenical Patriarch of Constantinople, made a joint declaration to address together the urgency of environmental sustainability.

Food banks 
In 2013, Welby disagreed strongly with Lord David Freud, the Parliamentary Under Secretary of State for Welfare Reform at the time, because Welby believes the UK government cuts to benefits have caused or contributed to the surge in food banks. Welby cited a Church of England investigation showing social services referred 35% of Durham residents who use food banks when benefits they were entitled to were not paid. Welby stated:

Before Christmas 2013, Welby urged people to give 10% of what they spend at Christmas to food banks.

In December 2014, Welby expressed concern about the increasing need for food banks which he said would have been "unthinkable" a decade ago. He called the plight of hungry poor people shocking because he did not expect that in the UK, saying that it was "a very sad fact that they're there, but also it's a great opportunity for the Church to demonstrate the love of Christ."

Fuel suppliers
Welby is concerned about rises in energy prices in the UK. He feels that energy companies have a responsibility towards customers and should take account of this rather than only maximising their own opportunities.

General election
In the run-up to the 2017 United Kingdom general election, Justin Welby and Archbishop of York John Sentamu campaigned over the need to address poverty, education, housing and health. The archbishops stressed the importance of "education for all, of urgent and serious solutions to our housing challenges, the importance of creating communities as well as buildings, and a confident and flourishing health service that gives support to all – especially the vulnerable – not least at the beginning and end of life."

High-interest lending 
In July 2013, Welby spoke out against the payday lending sites and met with Errol Damelin, chief executive of Wonga. Welby pledged that the Church of England would support credit unions as society needs to "provide an alternative" to the "very, very costly forms of finance" that payday lending services represent. He noted that he did not want to make legal payday lending illegal as this would leave people with no alternative to using criminal loan sharks.

Shortly after this well-publicised intervention in the public debate, it emerged that the Church of England's pension fund had invested money in Accel Partners, a venture capital firm that had invested in Wonga. This led to accusations of hypocrisy and Welby said that the investment was "very embarrassing" for the church. Welby and the Church's Ethical Investment Advisory Group were unaware of their investment in Wonga.

Welby also said that the Ethical Investment Advisory Group ought to reconsider rules which allow investment in companies that make up to 25% of their income from gambling, alcohol or high-interest lending.

Inequality
Welby has expressed concern about inequality in the UK. In September 2017 he said, "Our economic model is broken. Britain stands at a watershed moment where we need to make fundamental choices about the sort of economy we need. We are failing those who will grow up into a world where the gap between the richest and poorest parts of the country is significant and destabilising." He has praised the welfare state as a Christian endeavour emanating from the likes of R. H. Tawney, William Temple and William Beveridge. He also said in 2021 that the COVID-19 pandemic in the United Kingdom had exacerbated existing inequalities, and called for the building of "a new Beveridge".

Islam
In July 2014, Welby acknowledged that there was a problem with Muslim youths travelling to the Syrian Civil War and elsewhere to wage jihad but the numbers were "extraordinarily small", and so he dismissed concerns over the potential for trouble as "hysterical... I think we're in danger of slipping into a very fearful culture". In 2015, he offered his support for British air strikes against the Islamic State of Iraq and the Levant (ISIS) in Syria. Welby believes that the problem of Islamic extremism is far deeper than combating Islamic jihadists such as ISIS and Al-Qaeda; and that the Gulf monarchies and Saudi Arabia need to be challenged as their "own promotion of a particular brand of Islamic theology has provided a source from which ISIL have drawn a false legitimization." 

In an interview with The Daily Telegraph in November 2016, Welby stated that claiming that the actions of ISIS are "nothing to do with Islam" was damaging efforts to combat extremism. Welby stipulated that it was essential to understand the religious motivation behind extremism in order to understand it and, similarly, also criticised the argument that claims that "Christian militia in the Central African Republic are nothing to do with Christianity."

Modern slavery
Welby condemns modern slavery as a crime against humanity. He joined with Pope Francis and leaders of other faiths, Buddhist, Hindu, Jewish and Muslim, in a joint declaration they would work together aiming to end modern slavery by 2020. Forced labour and prostitution, human trafficking and organ trade were specifically mentioned but all relationships that do not respect human equality, freedom and dignity were condemned.

Persecution of Christians 
Welby is concerned that Christians are persecuted in some parts of the world, notably in the Middle East, and fears that some risk their lives going to church. Welby also said that Christians and other religious minorities were made to suffer terribly and were killed in Iraq, which violates article 18 of the Universal Declaration of Human Rights. Welby noted that Christians and other minorities face persecution for their faith in many areas worldwide; he cited Syria, South Sudan, and the Central African Republic among others. Welby urged the United Kingdom to open doors to refugees.

Poverty
Referring to poverty in the UK in March 2013, Welby criticised UK government changes which capped benefits below inflation.

In a speech at Christmas 2013 Welby said, "Even in a recovering economy, Christians, the servants of a vulnerable and poor saviour, need to act to serve and love the poor; they need also to challenge the causes of poverty." In a speech at Easter 2013 Welby said, "In this country, even as the economy improves there is weeping in broken families, in people ashamed to seek help from food banks, or frightened by debt. Asylum seekers weep with loneliness and missing far away families."

Referring to poverty in the UK and generally Welby said that "we should all share concern for the poor and the marginalised, should work to build communities where people act responsibly towards one another, whether we are rich or poor we all have the same dignity. William Beveridge, R. H. Tawney and William Temple played a significant part in establishing the post-war welfare state in the United Kingdom and were committed Christians. We do not have the luxury of saying, 'Something must be done' without doing anything ourselves."

Welby has said that justice of the powerful is not justice at all and judges should decide issues based on truth and the common good rather than class and money. Welby quoted Nelson Mandela that "dealing with poverty was a matter of justice rather than charity." Welby felt that speaking out about poverty, fuel bills, financial insecurity affecting families and credit unions is part of the Christian duty to love one's neighbour.

Welby has said that insecurity of income is also a problem for many people. He expressed concern that many people cannot save or plan for, for example a holiday because they do not know how much money will be coming in from week to week. In September 2018, Welby said:

Welby also said in 2018,

Refugees
Welby disagrees with restrictions on child refugees being admitted to the UK. In 2017, Welby expressed fears that children were vulnerable to exploitation and even death.

Sexuality and same-sex marriage

In March 2013, Welby stated that "My understanding of sexual ethics has been that, regardless of whether it's gay or straight, sex outside marriage is wrong." He reiterated this belief again later in 2013, further noting that "To abandon the ideal simply because it's difficult to achieve is ridiculous."

Welby does not unequivocally affirm the Church of England's historic opposition to same-sex marriage. At his first press conference he spoke out strongly against homophobia and stated that he is "always averse to the language of exclusion, when what we are called to is to love in the same way as Jesus Christ loves us." He also said "I know I need to listen very attentively to the LGBT [lesbian, gay, bisexual, and transgender] communities, and examine my own thinking prayerfully and carefully." Before his enthronement, he stated that he did not have doubts about the church's policy in opposing same-sex marriages but remained "challenged as to how we respond to it". "You see gay relationships that are just stunning in the quality of the relationship", he said, adding that he had "particular friends where I recognise that and am deeply challenged by it".

Welby sees problems with special services of blessing for same-sex couples, saying in 2014: "There is great fear among some, here and round the world, that that will lead to the betrayal of our traditions, to the denial of the authority of scripture, to apostasy, not to use too strong a word and there is also a great fear that our decisions will lead us to the rejection of LGBT people, to irrelevance in a changing society, to behaviour that many see akin to racism.  Both those fears are alive and well in this room today [a General Synod meeting in London]. We have to find a way forward that is one of holiness and obedience to the call of God and enables us to fulfil our purposes. This cannot be done through fear. How we go forward matters deeply, as does where we arrive". In 2016, Welby confirmed he appointed a bishop, Nicholas Chamberlain, who is in a same-sex relationship, and that he supports clergy who are in celibate same-sex relationships in line with the church's policy.

Welby has since said that he has become "much less certain" about his stance on human sexuality. In an interview with Alastair Campbell in October 2017, Archbishop Welby was asked if same-sex activity was sinful, and declined to give a clear answer, saying: "I don't do blanket condemnation of people". When asked if a stable relationship could be between two people of the same sex, Welby said "I know it could be", and accepted that faithfulness and love were the "absolutely central" aspects of relationships, but added:

He also stated that while homophobia was a sin, he did not consider it homophobic to oppose gay sex. In 2023, Welby announced that he supports a proposal by the House of Bishops that maintains that marriage is between one man and a woman but which would also authorise "prayers of thanksgiving, dedication and for God's blessing for same-sex couples." Speaking of his support for the proposal, Welby said he was "extremely, joyfully celebratory of these new resources" while he also clarified that he will not perform the blessings because of his role as an "instrument of unity" for the Anglican Communion. He is the first sitting Archbishop of Canterbury to support a proposal to allow blessings for same-sex unions in the Church of England.

Social injustice
Welby said in 2018 that social injustice was widespread and entrenched in British society. He said the gig economy was one of many injustices. Welby said in September 2018 that the weakest people got the least secure pensions and the strongest got the most secure pensions, stating:

Taxation
Welby said in December 2017 that tax avoidance was wrong and that many wealthy companies did not pay as much tax as they should. Welby said, "It is clear that a company that has a turnover of several billion and yet pays only a few million in tax, something isn’t quite working there. It is to do with transfer pricing, there are all kinds of explanations, but people who earn money from a society should pay tax in that society for the common good, for economic justice." 

In September 2018, Welby said:

Welby also said in 2018:

In October 2022, Welby criticised the UK government for introducing tax cuts for the wealthy and for pursuing policies that disproportiontely affected the poor.

Universal Credit
Welby has expressed concern that Universal Credit is harming poor people and said in September 2018 that its rollout should be stopped. Welby said:

Women bishops
Welby has been a strong supporter of Anglican consecration of women as bishops.  In November 2013, Welby stated he aimed to ordain women as bishops while allowing space for those who disagree. In February 2014, Welby called on Anglicans to avoid fear, prejudice and suspicion and to grasp "cultural change in the life of the church":

Welby would like discipline applied over appointments to prevent opponents of women as bishops feeling alienated. Welby says he hopes to avoid a zero-sum game where people feel gain for one side inevitably means loss for the other, he sees need for caution, co-operation and unity. Slightly revised legislation to allow women to be ordained bishops in the Church of England was agreed in July 2014 and became law in November 2014.

2023 Global South Fellowship of Anglican Churches schism 
On February 20, 2023, the Global South Fellowship of Anglican Churches released a statement stating that it had broken communion and no longer recognized Justin Welby as head of the Church, de facto marking a schism within the Church of England.

Controversies

Iwerne camps and John Smyth
In February 2017, Welby apologised unreservedly after allegations that barrister and evangelical Christian John Smyth beat boys in the late 1970s, mainly pupils at Winchester College, until their wounds bled and left permanent scars. Smyth was a senior member of Christian charity the Iwerne Trust in the 1970s and 1980s. These allegations were suppressed for decades, although Smyth was asked to leave the UK.

Welby's early grounding in Christian doctrine was rooted in the 'Bash Camp' network founded by Eric Nash. Welby became a dormitory officer at the camps held in the Dorset village of Iwerne Minster. From 1978–81, John Smyth allegedly carried out a series of brutal beatings on boys and undergraduates, recorded in a report written by Canon Mark Ruston in February 1982.

Smyth was described by Welby in 2017 as "charming" and "delightful" and they swapped Christmas cards for some years in the 1990s. In 1978, Welby left the UK to work in Paris, and Welby stated that "I had no contact with them at all". It later materialised that Welby had attended the camp in this period and had continued to receive the camp newsletter. Andrew Atherstone in the biography, Risk Taker and Reconciler, describes  Welby as having been "involved in the camps as an undergraduate […] businessman and theological college student in the 1980s and early 1990s."

In 2012, a victim of Smyth reported the abuse to the Church of England and Welby was informed in 2013. The Archbishop maintained that this was the first he had heard of the abuse by his old friend. The New York Times on 14 October 2017 quoted a senior Church of England figure as saying that "all senior members of the trust, including officers like Archbishop Welby, had been made aware of the allegations against Mr Smyth, even those who had been abroad". Questions have remained among Smyth victims as to when Welby first knew, and some have labelled the Archbishop an "observer", a term denoting a person who knew about abuse but who did not report appropriately. The Archbishop has said that he was not part of the inner circle of Smyth's friends and is on the record as saying that survivors must come first, not the Church's own interests.

Wedding of Prince Harry and Meghan Markle
During the interview of the Duke and Duchess of Sussex by Oprah Winfrey, first broadcast on 7 March 2021, the Duchess stated that the couple had got married by a private exchange of vows on Wednesday, 16 May 2018, three days before their official, public wedding on Saturday, 19 May 2018 and that Welby officiated at the ceremony, no other person being present. The Duke immediately confirmed this story. This created a controversy around the apparent irregularity of a secret marriage under English family law and Welby's participation in such an irregular ceremony. On 30 March 2021, Welby confirmed that he had presided over a private exchange of vows on the Wednesday. However, he also affirmed that the couple's legal marriage occurred on the Saturday, rejecting by implication suggestions that the earlier exchange of vows had constituted a legal marriage under an alleged exception to English law for royal marriages.

Personal life
Welby is married to Caroline Eaton and they have had six children. In 1983, their seven-month-old daughter, Johanna, died in a car crash in France. Referring to the tragedy, Welby explained, "It was a very dark time for my wife Caroline and myself, but in a strange way it actually brought us closer to God." Welby established a special day for bereaved parents at Coventry Cathedral where there is now an annual service commemorating the lives of children who have died.

His daughter Katharine has written of her experience of poor mental health. Another daughter, Ellie, has learning disabilities.

Welby acknowledges his privileged education and upbringing and has been praised for sending his own children to local state schools.

Welby is a French speaker and an avid Francophile, having lived and worked in France. An announcement about his appointment as Bishop of Durham listed his hobbies as "most things French and sailing".

Styles
 Master Justin Welby (1956–1974)
 Mr. Justin Welby (1974–1992)
 The Reverend Justin Welby (1992–2002)
 The Reverend Canon Justin Welby (2002–2007)
 The Very Reverend Justin Welby (2007–2011)
 The Right Reverend Justin Welby (personal: 2011–2013)
 His Lordship the Right Reverend the Lord Bishop of Durham (office: 2011–2013)
 The Most Reverend Justin Welby (personal: 4 – 12 February 2013)
 The Most Reverend and Right Honourable Justin Welby (personal: 12 February 2013 – present)
 His Grace the Most Reverend and Right Honourable Justin Welby, Lord Archbishop of Canterbury, Primate of all England (office: 2013 – present)
 His Grace the Most Reverend and Right Honourable Dr Justin Welby DD, Lord Archbishop of Canterbury, Primate of all England (office: January 2015 – present)

Arms

References

External links

 
 
 , featuring Welby's comments on the Archbishop of Canterbury's (Rowan Williams) views about Sharia law
 The Daily Telegraph article about Welby being featured in Who's Who
 , featuring Welby's comments on "Reinventing the cross" as part of his ministry at Coventry Cathedral
 , House of Lords debate regarding Nigeria. Welby was part of a team researching the ethics of the situation
 Welby declared that abortion as "delayed contraception" is wrong.

1956 births
21st-century Church of England bishops
English people of Scottish descent
Alumni of Cranmer Hall, Durham
Alumni of St John's College, Durham
Alumni of Trinity College, Cambridge
Archbishops of Canterbury
Bishops of Durham
British businesspeople in the oil industry
Deans of Liverpool
Doctors of Divinity
English expatriates in France
Evangelical Anglican bishops
Living people
Lords Spiritual
Members of the Privy Council of the United Kingdom
People educated at Eton College
People educated at St Peter's School, Seaford
Clergy from Lincolnshire
Anglican clergy from London